Douai (formerly spelled Douay or Doway in English) is a city in the Nord département in northern France. It is a sub-prefecture of the department.

History
Its site probably corresponds to that of a 4th-century Roman fortress known as Duacum. From the 10th century, the town was a romance fiefdom of the counts of Flanders. The town became a flourishing textile market centre during the Middle Ages, historically known as Douay or Doway in English. In 1384, the county of Flanders passed into the domains of the Dukes of Burgundy and thence in 1477 into Habsburg possessions.

In 1667, Douai was taken by the troops of Louis XIV of France, and by the 1668 Treaty of Aix-la-Chapelle, the town was ceded to France. During successive sieges from 1710 to 1712, Douai was almost completely destroyed by the British Army. By 1713, the town was fully integrated into France. Douai became the seat of the Parliament of Flanders (fr).

The local airfield at La Brayelle was very significant in the history of French aviation. It operated from 1907 to the mid-1950s. In 1909 it was the site of the world’s first aeronautical meeting, 

Douai was again caught up in hostilities in World War I. when for much of the war it was occupied by the Germans. La Brayelle airfield was a base of Manfred von Richthofen, the Red Baron. Later in 1918, the town was partly burned, and was liberated by the British Army after the Battle of Courtrai.

Geography

Climate

Douai has a oceanic climate (Köppen climate classification Cfb).

Main sites
Douai's ornate Gothic-style belfry was begun in 1380, on the site of an earlier tower. The 80 m high structure includes an impressive carillon, consisting of 62 bells spanning 5 octaves. The originals, some dating from 1391, were removed in 1917 during World War I by the occupying German forces, who intended to melt them down for the metal. They were reinstalled after repairs in 1924, but 47 of them were replaced in 1954 to obtain a better sound. An additional larger bell in the summit, a La called "Joyeuse", dates from 1471 and weighs 5.5 tonnes. The chimes are rung by a mechanism every quarter-hour, but are also played via a keyboard on Saturday mornings and at certain other times. In 2005 the belfry was inscribed on the UNESCO World Heritage List as a part of the Belfries of Belgium and France site, in recognition of its architecture and importance in the history of municipal power in France.

The substantial Porte de Valenciennes town gate, a reminder of the town's past military importance, was built in 1453. One face is built in Gothic style, while the other is of Classical design.

Economy
Douai's main industries  are in the chemical and metal engineering sectors.

Since 1970, Renault has a large automobile assembly line nearby, called Usine Georges Besse after assassinated CEO Georges Besse. It produced vehicles such as the R14, R11, R19, Mégane and Scénic. Following industry changes, it now makes electric cars.

The Gare de Douai railway station is served by regional trains to Lille, Arras, Lens, Amiens, Saint-Quentin and Valenciennes. It connects to the TGV network, with high speed trains to Paris, Lyon, Nantes and other places.

Population

University

The University of Douai was founded under the patronage of Phillip II when Douai belonged to the Spanish Netherlands.

It was prominent, from the 1560s until the French Revolution, as a centre for the education of English Catholics escaping persecution in England. Connected with the University were not only the English College, Douai, founded by William Allen, but also the Irish and Scottish colleges and the Benedictine, Franciscan and Jesuit houses. Throughout Europe, there were around 800 such seminaries. They prepared Jesuits for missionary work in England, with 60 migrating in the 1570s, and around 500 by 1603. The first Jesuits were Edmund Campion and Robert Parsons.

The Benedictine priory of St Gregory the Great was founded by Saint John Roberts at Douai in 1605, with a handful of exiled English Benedictines who had entered various monasteries in Spain, as the first house after the Reformation to begin conventual life. The community was established within the English Benedictine Congregation and started a college for English Catholic boys unable to find a Catholic education at home, and pursued studies at the University of Douai. The community was expelled at the time of the French Revolution in 1793 and, after some years of wandering, finally settled at Downside Abbey, Somerset, in 1814.

Another English Benedictine community, the Priory of St. Edmund, which had been formed in Paris in 1615 by Dom Gabriel Gifford, later Archbishop of Rheims and primate of France, was expelled from Paris during the Revolution, and eventually took over the vacant buildings of the community of St Gregory's in 1818. Later, following Waldeck-Rousseau's Law of Associations (1901), this community also returned to England in 1903, where it was established at Douai Abbey, near Reading. Douai School continued as an educational establishment for boys until 1999.

In 1609 the English College published a translation of the Old Testament, which, together with the New Testament published at Rheims 27 years earlier, was the Douay–Rheims Bible used by Anglophone Roman Catholics almost exclusively for more than 300 years.

For a time there was a Carthusian monastery (charterhouse) in Douai, which is now the Musée de la Chartreuse de Douai.

Notable people
Douai was the birthplace of:

 Jehan Bellegambe (1470–1536), early Flemish painter
 François Cosserat (1852–1914), mathematician and engineer
 Henri-Edmond Cross (1856–1910), printmaker, painter
 Gaston Crunelle (1898–1990), classical flautist
 Charles Alexandre de Calonne (1734–1802), statesman
 Marceline Desbordes-Valmore (1786–1859), poet
 Henri-Joseph Dulaurens (1719–1793), novelist
 Giambologna (1529–1608), born as Jean Boulogne, sculptor
 Jacky Henin (born 1960), politician and Member of the European Parliament
 Corinne Masiero (born 1964), actress
 André Obey (1892–1975), playwright
 Michel Warlop (1911–1947), jazz violinist
 Michel Wibault (1897–1963), aircraft designer and inventor

Twin towns
Douai is twinned with:
 Harrow, United Kingdom
 Recklinghausen, Germany
 Kenosha, United States
 Dédougou, Burkina Faso
 Seraing, Belgium

Former twin towns:

 Puławy, Poland
Twickenham, United Kingdom

References

External links

 Douai official website (in French)

 
Communes of Nord (French department)
Subprefectures in France
French Flanders